Baldred may refer to:

People
Baldred Bisset ( 1260 –  1311), medieval Scottish lawyer
King Baldred of Kent, king of the Kentishmen, until 825
Saint Baldred of Tyninghame (or Baldred of Strathclyde), Anglo-Saxon hermit and abbot, resident in East Lothian during the 8th century

Others
Baldred Rock, in Fitchie Bay at Laurie Island in the South Orkney Islands